Identified is the second  studio album by Vanessa Hudgens, released on July 1, 2008 in the U.S. June 24, 2008 in Japan, February 13, 2009 in most European countries and February 16, 2009 in the United Kingdom. The album received generally positive reviews from music critics. Hudgens embarked on her first concert tour, Identified Summer Tour between August and September 2008 in support of the album.

Release

Singles
"Sneakernight" was released as the first and only single from the album. The track, produced by J.R. Rotem, was released on May 27, 2008 in the United States and February 8, 2009 in Europe. The song peaked at number 88 on the Billboard Hot 100. The music video was filmed by Malcolm Jones and premiered on June 13, 2008.

Critical reception

Identified has received generally favorable reviews, having a 63 "metascore" based on 7 reviews. Billboard said that the album "panders to the preteen demo with stop-start pop that ranges from pleasant (the title track) to dull ("Amazed") to off-putting ("Hook It Up"). But for little girls, this is one nonstop sing-along." The New York Times said that "a handful of songs like this would have sufficed to help mature her image, and yet "Identified" is far more interesting and unexpected."

Blender gave it a three stars out of five, and claimed that her "voice was made to rip, and when she lets go just a little, the coyness turns sultry—proof that she might just have a life after high school." Variety said that Identified "shows that the High School Musical veteran is definitely ready to graduate. The better parts of the album find her reaching for a more mature sound, but she hedges her bets with large portions of treacly teen-pop...The weakest link in most of the songs is Hudgens thin, piping voice."

Track listing

Personnel
The following people contributed to Identified
 Vanessa Hudgens – lead vocals
 Lil Mama – featuring vocals
 Vanessa Hudgens, Rock Mafia, Cathy Dennis, Kara DioGuardi, Leah Haywood, Nasri, Tim James, Ashley Valentin, Christopher Rojas, Carlos Alvarez – additional and background vocals
 Lukasz Gottwald – keyboards
 Jack Daley – bass
 Tyrone Johnson, Scott Jacoby – guitar

Production
 Jonathan "J.R." Rotem, Dr. Luke, Christopher Rojas, Emanuel Kiriakou, Devrim Karaoglu, Daniel James, Scott Jacoby, Antonina Armato, Matt Beckley – executive producers
 Chris Gehringer – mastering
 Nick Banns – mastering assistant
 Jason Recon Coons, Matty Green, Steve Hammons, Scott Jacoby, Emily Wright – engineers
 Jon Lind, Mio Vukovic – A&R
 Miranda Penn Turin – photography

Chart performance
Identified debuted at #23 on the US Billboard 200 with 22,000 copies sold in its first week, 12,000 less than her first album, V.

Charts

Weekly charts

Monthly charts

Release history

References

2008 albums
Vanessa Hudgens albums
Albums produced by Benny Blanco
Albums produced by Dr. Luke
Albums produced by Emanuel Kiriakou
Albums produced by J. R. Rotem
Albums produced by Rock Mafia
Albums produced by the Messengers (producers)
Hollywood Records albums